The 2007 Ukrainian Super Cup became the fourth edition of Ukrainian Super Cup, an annual football match contested by the winners of the previous season's Ukrainian Top League and Ukrainian Cup competitions. Dynamo Kyiv had won both competitions.

The match was played at the Central Stadium "Chornomorets", Odessa, on 10 July 2007, and contested by league winner Dynamo Kyiv and cup runner-up Shakhtar Donetsk. Dynamo won it 4–2 on penalties.

Match

Details

2007
Supercup
Super Cup 2007
Super Cup 2007
Sport in Odesa
Association football penalty shoot-outs